Donald Stephen Pavletich (July 13, 1938 – March 5, 2020) was an American professional baseball player. He was a catcher and first baseman for the Cincinnati Redlegs / Reds (1957, 1959 and 1962–68), Chicago White Sox (1969) and Boston Red Sox (1970–71).

Pavletich was a graduate of Nathan Hale High School in West Allis, Wisconsin and was signed as an amateur free agent in 1956 by the Reds.

Pavletich made his Major League debut at the young age of 18 on April 20, 1957, in a 5–4 loss to the Milwaukee Braves at County Stadium, grounding out as a pinch-hitter for Hal Jeffcoat against Ray Crone. It was his only Major League appearance and at-bat of the season, and he also made one hitless at bat in one appearance in the 1959 season.

Pavletich served in the U.S. Army from May 1957 to February 1959.

Pavletich's first Major League hit was in the first game of a doubleheader on April 29, 1962, in a 16–3 Reds loss to the St. Louis Cardinals. Replacing Reds catcher Johnny Edwards midway through the fourth inning, in the next inning Pavletich singled off the Cardinals' Larry Jackson.

Pavletich spent much of his career with the Reds as a backup catcher to all-stars Ed Bailey, Johnny Edwards and Baseball Hall of Fame legend Johnny Bench. 

Pavletich was part of a ten-player trade that sent him, George Scott, Jim Lonborg, Ken Brett, Billy Conigliaro and Joe Lahoud from the Boston Red Sox to the Milwaukee Brewers for Tommy Harper, Marty Pattin, Lew Krausse and minor-league outfielder Pat Skrable on October 10, 1971.

In 12 Major League seasons Pavletich played in 536 games with 1,373 at bats, 163 runs, 349 hits, 46 home runs, 193 RBI and a .254 batting average. He recorded an overall .987 fielding percentage.

Pavletich died at the age of 81 on March 5, 2020, and was interred in Wisconsin Memorial Park, Brookfield, Waukesha County, Wisconsin.

References

External links

Baseball Almanac
Venezuelan Professional Baseball League

1938 births
2020 deaths
Baseball players from Milwaukee
Boston Red Sox players
Chicago White Sox players
Cincinnati Redlegs players
Cincinnati Reds players
Columbia Reds players
Indianapolis Indians players
Leones del Caracas players
American expatriate baseball players in Venezuela
Major League Baseball catchers
Major League Baseball first basemen
San Diego Padres (minor league) players
Topeka Hawks players
Topeka Reds players